
 
UN Women Goodwill Ambassador is an official postnominal honorific title, title of authority, legal status and job description assigned to those goodwill ambassadors and advocates who are designated by the United Nations. UN Women goodwill ambassadors are celebrity advocates for the United Nations Entity for Gender Equality and the Empowerment of Women also known as UN Women; who use their talent, popularity or fame to assist the UN in better addressing a coordinated, comprehensive response to the interrelated issues of equality and  working for the empowerment of women. 

In 2011 UNIFEM was merged into UN Women to be redeveloped as a multi focus sub-division of the United Nations. UN Women has enlisted the help of prominent and influential personalities from the worlds of art, music, film, sport and literature to highlight key issues and to draw attention to its activities to promote issues important to women.

Current UN Women goodwill ambassadors 
Current listed and supporting goodwill ambassadors, and the year they were appointed:

See also 
 Goodwill Ambassador
 FAO Goodwill Ambassador
 UNDP Goodwill Ambassador
 UNESCO Goodwill Ambassador
 UNFPA Goodwill Ambassador
 UNHCR Goodwill Ambassador
 UNICEF Goodwill Ambassador
 UNIDO Goodwill Ambassador
 UNODC Goodwill Ambassador
 WFP Goodwill Ambassador
 WHO Goodwill Ambassador

References

External links 

 UN Women Goodwill Ambassadors

Goodwill ambassador programmes
United Nations goodwill ambassadors